Glamourpuss is the sixth album by the Danish rock band Sort Sol and the fourth after the renaming from the earlier name Sods. It is their most commercially successful to date, and includes their biggest hit "Let Your Fingers Do The Walking". It is also the last to be recorded with the original member Peter Peter, who left the band after touring in support of the album.

Track listing
"Dog Star Man" - 4:09 (Odde/Ortved, PP, S. Jørgensen, T. Tholstoy, Top-Galia)
"Popcorn" - 4:19 (S. Jørgensen/Odde, Ortved, PP, Top-Galia)
"Let Your Fingers Do The Walking" - 4:40 (S. Jørgensen/Top-Galia)
"Sleepwalker" - 3:41 (Odde/Klavs K, Ortved, PP)
"Shaheeba Bay" - 4:03 (Odde/Odde, Ortved, S. Jørgensen, Top-Galia)
"Written in the Wind" - 5:11 (Odde)
"Eileen Alphabet" - 2:10 (Odde/Odde, PP)
"Bangalore Flow" - 7:37 (S. Jørgensen/Top-Galia)
"Lady of the Lake" - 4:08 (Odde/Odde, PP)

Personnel
Sort Sol
 Lars Top-Galia – guitar
 Knud Odde – bass guitar
 Peter Peter – lead guitar
 Steen Jørgensen – vocals
 Tomas Ortved – drums

Additional musicians and production
 Wili Jønsson – backing vocals on "Dog Star Man" and "Sleepwalker", additional bass guitar and mellotron on "Let Your Fingers Do The Walking", backing vocals, additional bass guitar and mellotron on "Written In The Wind", backing vocals, additional bass guitar and piano on "Bangalore Flow"
 Alex Nyborg Madsen – backing vocals on "Dog Star Man", "Popcorn", "Shaheeba Bay" and "Bangalore Flow"
 Ole Theill – tabla on "Bangalore Flow"
 Povl Kristian – strings on "Bangalore Flow" and "Lady Of The Lake"
 Flemming Rasmussen – production, mixing and engineering
 Simon Vinestock – mixing
 Henrik Vindeby – assisting engineering
 Lene Reidel – mastering

1993 albums
Sort Sol albums
Columbia Records albums